Licq-Athérey is a commune in the Pyrénées-Atlantiques department in south-western France.

It is located in the former province of Soule.

Sights
Licq has a church (Church of St. Julien) whose origins date back to the Middle Ages and was substantially revised in the nineteenth century.

See also
Communes of the Pyrénées-Atlantiques department

References

Communes of Pyrénées-Atlantiques
Pyrénées-Atlantiques communes articles needing translation from French Wikipedia